Gnathopogon nicholsi is a species of ray-finned fish in the genus Gnathopogon endemic to the Yangtze River basin in China.

Named in honor of John Treadwell Nichols (1883-1958), curator of fishes at the American Museum of Natural History.

References

Gnathopogon
Cyprinid fish of Asia
Freshwater fish of China
Fish described in 1943